The Fault is History is an album by Christian R&B Group Souljahz.

Track listing
"Let Go"
"All Around the World"
"Same 'Ol Game"
"Vejea Speaks on Racism"
"The Color Hate"
"Reflection"
"Beneath the Surface"
"True Love Waits"
"Vejea Speaks on Poverty"
"Poor Man"
"Souljahz Don't Stop"
"Worship"
"The Anthem"
"Keep Risin'"
"Keep Risin'" (Instrumental Version)

Album credits
Hubert Robertson:  Executive Producer
Dan Needham:  Drums
Kiko Cibrian:  Guitar
Beth Herzhaft:  Photography
Gavin Lurssen:  Mastering
F. Reid Shippen:  Mixing
Craig Young:  Bass, Guitar, Digital Editing, Drum Programming, Engineer
Barry Landis:  Executive Producer
Carl Hergesell:  Keyboards
Tonéx:  Keyboards, Vocals, Drum Programming, Producer
Philip LaRue:  Vocals
Souljahz:  Main Performer
Javier Solís:  Percussion
John Catchings:  Cello
David Davidson:  Violin, Viola

2002 albums